Five Wishes is a United States advance directive created by the non-profit organization Aging with Dignity. It has been described as the "living will with a heart and soul".

History
Five Wishes was originally introduced in 1996 as a Florida-only document, combining a living will and health care power of attorney in addition to addressing matters of comfort care and spirituality. With help from the American Bar Association's Commission on Law and Aging and leading medical experts, a national version of Five Wishes was introduced in 1998. It was originally distributed with support from a grant by the Robert Wood Johnson Foundation. With assistance from the United Health Foundation, Five Wishes is now available in 28 languages and in Braille. More than 40 million documents have been distributed by a network of over 40,000 partner organizations worldwide. An online version called Five Wishes Online was introduced in April 2011 allowing users to complete the document using an online interface or print out a blank version to complete by hand. An updated version, renamed Five Wishes Digital, debuted in 2022, including options for all 50 states, and fully digital signing and witnessing options.

The Five Wishes

Wishes 1 and 2 are both legal documents. Once signed, they meet the legal requirements for an advance directive in the states listed below. Wishes 3, 4, and 5 are unique to Five Wishes, in that they address matters of comfort care, spirituality, forgiveness, and final wishes.

Wish 1: The Person I Want to Make Care Decisions for Me When I Can't 
This section is an assignment of a health care agent (also called proxy, surrogate, representative, or health care power of attorney). This person makes medical decisions on your behalf if you are unable to speak for yourself.

Wish 2: The Kind of Medical Treatment I Want or Don't Want
This section is a living will—a definition of what life support treatment means to you, and when you would and would not want it.

Wish 3: How Comfortable I Want to Be
This section addresses matters of comfort care—what type of pain management you would like, personal grooming and bathing instructions, and whether you would like to know about options for hospice care, among others.

Wish 4: How I Want People to Treat Me
This section speaks to personal matters, such as whether you would like to be at home and whether you would like someone to pray at your bedside.

Wish 5: What I Want My Loved Ones to Know
This section deals with matters of forgiveness, how you wish to be remembered, and final wishes regarding funeral or memorial plans.

Signing and witnessing requirements
The last portion of the document contains a section for signing the document and having it witnessed. The document indicates which states require notarization.

Legal requirements
According to analysis by the American Bar Association's Commission on Law and Aging, Five Wishes currently meets the legal requirements for an advance directive in the following 46 states and the District of Columbia. In the remaining 4 states, (Kansas, New Hampshire, Ohio, Texas) a statutory form is required, and one must attach the state document if one wishes to use the Five Wishes document as a guide.

Translations
Five Wishes has been translated from English into 29 other languages: Albanian; Arabic; Armenian; Bengali; Chinese Traditional; Chinese Simplified; Croatian; Farsi; French; German; Gujarati; Haitian Creole; Hebrew; Hindi; Hmong; Ilocano; Italian; Japanese; Khmer; Korean; Polish; Portuguese; Punjabi; Russian; Somali; Spanish; Tagalog; Urdu; Vietnamese.

References

External links
 

Legal documents
Health law in the United States